The 2019 World Aquatics Championships were the 18th FINA World Aquatics Championships, held in Gwangju, South Korea from 12 to 28 July 2019. The city had previously hosted the 2015 Summer Universiade aquatics events in the same venues.

Host selection
The host was announced on 19 July 2013 on the biennial General Congress of FINA in Barcelona, the host-city of the 2013 World Aquatics Championships. Budapest was awarded the 2021 Championships in the same vote, though in 2015 it was announced that they will host the 2017 Championships due to Guadalajara's withdrawal. Fukuoka was subsequently awarded the 2021 event.

The awarding was controversial within Korea as the South Korean government claimed that the mayor of Gwangju had forged the signature of endorsement. As a result, the Korean government initially refused to fund the event, but eventually agreed upon passage of a law that required National Assembly approval for future bids for major sporting events.

Symbols
The mascots for the event were a pair of otters, chosen due to their natural habitat being in the mountains near Gwangju, as well as their symbolizing "swimmers' passion for challenge", according to the organizing committee. The slogan of the Championships, meanwhile, was "Dive Into Peace".

Venues
Most of the competitions were held at the Main Aquatics Centre, built for the 2015 Summer Universiade, also hosted in Gwangju. The Aquatics Centre hosted the swimming and diving competitions, and there were two adjacent outdoor temporary venues for synchronised swimming and water polo.

 Nambu University Municipal Aquatics Center (swimming, diving)
 Nambu University Stadium (water polo)
 Yeomju Gymnasium (artistic swimming)
 Chosun University Football Field (high diving)
 Yeosu Expo Ocean Park (open water swimming)

Schedule
A total of 76 medal events were held across six disciplines. Beach water polo was introduced as a demonstration, non-medal event.

Medal table
China topped the medal table, although the United States won the highest number of medals in total. Host nation South Korea earned one bronze medal, from Kim Su-ji in the Women's 1 m springboard.

Participating nations
Out of 209 FINA members, 191 nations took part in the Championships, as well as a Refugee Team of independent FINA athletes. 194 teams initially entered, setting a new record number of participating nations. However, Lesotho and the United Arab Emirates subsequently withdrew their athletes and did not appear on the start list.
 FINA members not participating were Anguilla, Belize, British Virgin Islands, Chad, Republic of the Congo, Democratic Republic of the Congo, Dominica, Guinea-Bissau, Gibraltar, Iraq, Lesotho, Liberia, Mauritania, Myanmar, North Korea, Somalia, Turks and Caicos Islands and United Arab Emirates.
 At the time of the Championships, the National Olympic Committees of Kiribati, Nauru, South Sudan, São Tomé e Príncipe and Tuvalu were not FINA members.

Media coverage
In the United States, NBCUniversal holds rights to the event.

References

External links
Official website 

 
2019
Swimming competitions in South Korea
World Championships
World Aquatics Championships
Sports competitions in Gwangju
World Championships, 2019
World Aquatics Championships